Abdul Nasser Al-Sayegh (born 19 February 1959) is a Kuwaiti épée and foil fencer. He competed at the 1976 and 1984 Summer Olympics, and had a record of 0-18.

References

External links
 

1959 births
Living people
Kuwaiti male épée fencers
Olympic fencers of Kuwait
Fencers at the 1976 Summer Olympics
Fencers at the 1984 Summer Olympics
Kuwaiti male foil fencers